MT Melsungen  is a German handball team from Melsungen, Germany, that plays in the Handball-Bundesliga.

History
From 1992 to 2005, the team played in the 2. Handball-Bundesliga and finished third twice (in 1997/98 and 2003/2004). In the 2004/2005 season, he won 29 of 34 matches and took first place in the 2. Handball-Bundesliga, making his way to the Handball-Bundesliga. In the debut season of 2005/2006, MT Melsungen took 12th place in the top class. In 1996, 2013 and 2014, the team made it to the DHB-Pokal in Hamburg, but failed there in the semi-finals. In the 2019/20 DHB-Pokal, the team made it to the finals for the first time, but was eliminated against TBV Lemgo there.

Crest, colours, supporters

Naming history

Kits

Sports Hall information

Name: – Rothenbach-Halle
City: – Kassel
Capacity: – 4300
Address: – Damaschkestraße 55, 34121 Kassel, Germany

Team

Current squad 

Squad for the 2022-23 season

Transfers
Transfers for the 2023–24 season

Joining 
  Bakary Diallo (LB) (from  Fenix Toulouse Handball) ?
  Erik Balenciaga (CB) (from  Fenix Toulouse Handball) 
  Dainis Krištopāns (RB) (from  Paris Saint-Germain) 
  Jannik Kohlbacher (P) (from  Rhein-Neckar Löwen) ?

Leaving 
  Finn Lemke (LB) (Retires)
  Agustín Casado (CB) (to  Telekom Veszprém)
  Aidenas Malašinskas (CB) (to ?)
  Kai Häfner (RB) (to  TVB Stuttgart) ?

Technical staff
 Head coach:  Roberto García Parrondo
 Assistant coach:  Arjan Haenen
 Athletic Trainer:  Florian Sölter
 Physiotherapist:  René Kagel
 Physiotherapist:  Dennis Nguyen
 Club doctor:  Dr. Gerd Rauch

Previous squads

EHF Ranking

Former club members

Notable former players

  Michael Allendorf (2010-2022)
  Felix Danner (2009-2021)
  Johannes Golla (2015-2018)
  Heiko Grimm (2015)
  Kai Häfner (2019-)
  Silvio Heinevetter (2020-2022)
  Timo Kastening (2020-)
  Andrej Klimovets (2010-2011)
  Yves Kunkel (2018-2022)
  Julius Kühn (2017-)
  Finn Lemke (2017-)
  Michael Müller (2013-2019)
  Philipp Müller (2013-2019)
  Tobias Reichmann (2017-2022)
  Timm Schneider (2015-2020)
  Jens Schöngarth (2009-2012)
  Johannes Sellin (2013-2017)
  Harald Beilschmied (2001-2004)
  Dalibor Anušić (2009-2010)
  Ivan Brouka (2005-2011)
  Vitali Feshchanka (2011)
  Andrej Kurchev (2006-2008)
  Mario Kelentrić (2007-2012)
  David Mandić (2022-)
  Marino Marić (2014-2022)
  Ivan Martinović (2022-)
  Domagoj Pavlović (2018-)
  Goran Šprem (2006)
  Petr Házl (2004-2008)
  Petr Hrubý (2004-2008)
  Jiří Hynek (2005-2006)
  Daniel Kubeš (2012-2014)
  Michal Kraus (2004-2008)
  Radek Musil (2004-2008)
  Thomas Klitgaard (2007-2010)
  Lasse Mikkelsen (2017-2021)
  René Villadsen (2015-2017)
  Dener Jaanimaa (2016-2018)
  Franck Junillon (2008-2010)
  Spyros Balomenos (2006–2008)
  Giorgos Chalkidis (2006–2007)
  Savas Karipidis (2007–2013)
  Grigorios Sanikis (2005–2013)
  Dimitrios Tzimourtos (2008–2010)
  Alexandros Vasilakis (2009-2013)
  Arnar Freyr Arnarsson (2020-)
  Elvar Örn Jónsson (2021-)
  Alexander Petersson (2021-2022)
  Nebojša Simić (2017-)
  Jeffrey Boomhouwer (2014-2018)
  Arjan Haenen (2016–2018)
  Adam Morawski (2022-)
  Paweł Orzłowski (2008–2009)
  André Gomes (2021-)
  Gleb Kalarash (2021-)
  Andrej Lavrov (2004-2005)
  Zoran Đorđić (2005-2007)
  Momir Rnić (2014-2017)
  Vladica Stojanović (2006-2010)
  Milan Torbica (2010-2011)
  Svetislav Verkić (2016-2017)
  Nenad Vučković (2008-2017)
  Roman Sidorowicz (2018-2020)
  Daniel Valo (2005–2009)
  Mikael Appelgren (2012-2015)
  Patrik Fahlgren (2011-2017)
  Anton Månsson (2010–2014)
  Per Sandström (2011-2015)
  Johan Sjöstrand (2015-2020)
  Jonathan Stenbäcken (2012-2014)
  Daniel Tellander (2007-2010)

Former coaches

References

External links
 Official website
 

German handball clubs
Handball-Bundesliga
Sport in Hesse
Handball clubs established in 1861
1861 establishments in Germany